Syamsul Anwar Harahap (born 1 August 1952) is an Indonesian boxer. He competed in the men's light welterweight event at the 1976 Summer Olympics.

References

1952 births
Living people
Indonesian male boxers
Olympic boxers of Indonesia
Boxers at the 1976 Summer Olympics
People from Pematangsiantar
Boxers at the 1974 Asian Games
Boxers at the 1978 Asian Games
Asian Games competitors for Indonesia
Southeast Asian Games medalists in boxing
Light-welterweight boxers
20th-century Indonesian people